Vrina may refer to:

Vrinë, a village in Markat municipality in Sarandë District, Albania
Vrina, Greece, a village in Skillounta municipality in Elis, Greece